Albania competed at the 1992 Summer Olympics in Barcelona, Spain. It had been twenty years since the nation had last participated in the Summer Olympics, specifically at the Games in Munich.

Competitors
The following is the list of number of competitors in the Games.

Athletics

Women

Combined events – Heptathlon

Shooting

Men

Women

Swimming

Men

Weightlifting

References 

 sports-reference

Nations at the 1992 Summer Olympics
1992
1992 in Albanian sport